Tukhul is an exclosure located in between the villages of Tukhul and Miheni in the Dogu'a Tembien woreda of the Tigray Region in Ethiopia. The area has been protected since 1998 by the local community.

Timeline
 1998: established as exclosure by the community
 2017: support by the EthioTrees project

Environmental characteristics
 Area: 36 ha
 Average slope gradient: 16%
 Aspect: the exclosure is oriented towards the south and the east
 Minimum altitude: 1959 metres
 Maximum altitude: 2039 metres
 Lithology: Antalo Limestone

Management
As a general rule, cattle ranging and wood harvesting are not allowed. The grasses are harvested once yearly and taken to the homesteads of the village to feed livestock. Physical soil and water conservation has been implemented to enhance infiltration, and vegetation growth. There are two guards to protect the exclosure. Field observations showed that no illegal grazing occurred in the exclosure in 2018.

Benefits for the community
Setting aside such areas fits with the long-term vision of the communities were hiza’iti lands are set aside for use by the future generations. It has also direct benefits for the community:
 improved ground water availability
 honey production
 
 climate ameliorator (temperature, moisture)
 the sequestered carbon (in total 73 tonnes per ha, dominantly sequestered in the soil, and additionally in the woody vegetation) is certified using the Plan Vivo voluntary carbon standard, after which carbon credits are sold
 the revenues are then reinvested in the villages, according to the priorities of the communities; it may be for an additional class in the village school, a water pond, or conservation in the exclosures.

Biodiversity

With vegetation growth, biodiversity in this exclosure hast strongly improved: there is more varied vegetation and wildlife. Particularly, with regard to birdlife, one may observe black-winged lovebird, greyish eagle-owl, hoopoe, black-billed wood hoopoe, banded barbet, Nubian woodpecker, Abyssinian woodpecker, grey-headed batis and montane white-eye.  In the adjacent seasonal grazing land Clapperton's francolin, black-bellied bustard, and red-backed shrike, can be spotted during the tall grass season.

References

External links
 EthioTrees on Davines website
 EthioTrees project website
 EthioTrees on Plan Vivo website
 Link For Forestry Projects

1998 establishments in Ethiopia
Land management
Environmental conservation
Greenhouse gas emissions
Emissions reduction
Carbon finance
Exclosures of Tigray Region
 
Dogu'a Tembien